Craspedonema is a genus of nematodes in the family Bunonematidae.

References

External links 

 

Rhabditida genera
Bunonematidae